Lightning Machine is the second EP released by the Japanese rock band The Teenage Kissers. A song from the EP, "Night Night Night", had previously been released as a limited edition physical single on July 5, 2013. The EP was released on August 5, 2015, by Gaze Records. The music video for "Psychic Haze" was posted to the band's official YouTube page on July 20, 2015. A double A-side single was released by the band with a remix of "Violent Lips" by Araki of Storoboy and a remix of "Out of Control" by Toru Matsumoto of TRMTRM.

Track listing

Personnel
 Nana Kitade – vocals, lyrics
 Hideo Nekota – bass guitar
 Mai Koike – drums
 Tsubasa Nakada – guitar

References

2015 EPs
EPs by Japanese artists
The Teenage Kissers albums